Gino Rovere (24 September 1897- 12 January 1965) is a former Italian racing driver. He competed in 20 races between 1934 and 1938 in Alfa Romeo's, Maserati's and Bugatti's. In 1936 he invested in Officine Alfieri Maserati, at the same time assigning his protégé Giuseppe Farina as chairman.

Complete results

References

Italian racing drivers
Mille Miglia drivers
Living people
Grand Prix drivers
1897 births